Adál Alberto Maldonado (November 1, 1948December 9, 2020), styled as ADÁL, was a photographer who lived and worked in New York City and Puerto Rico. Primarily a portrait photographer, his works focused on the concept of identity. He also worked on musical performances and installations. Maldonado is associated with the Nuyorican movement.

Maldonado was born in Utuado, Puerto Rico, on November 1, 1948. His family moved to Trenton, New Jersey, when he was 13, and then to the Bronx when he was 17.

Among Maldonado's works is a mixed-media installation and website titled El Puerto Rican Embassy (1994), developed in collaboration with Pedro Pietri. (According to Acosta-Belén and Santiago, the concept is due to Eduardo Figueroa.) For the project, Maldonado and Pietri created a Puerto Rican passport and named ambassadors for Puerto Rico.

Publications

References 

1948 births
2020 deaths
20th-century American photographers
21st-century American photographers
People from Trenton, New Jersey
People from Utuado, Puerto Rico